Riečka is a village and municipality in the Rimavská Sobota District of the Banská Bystrica Region of southern Slovakia. Its Hungarian name is Sajórecske.

External links
https://web.archive.org/web/20070427022352/http://www.statistics.sk/mosmis/eng/run.html

Villages and municipalities in Rimavská Sobota District